is a video game in the Mario Tennis series developed by Camelot Software Planning and published by Nintendo for the Wii U, released internationally in November 2015, and released in Japan in January 2016. The game received mixed reviews from critics; it was criticized for a lack of additional modes, its presentation, its character roster, and a perceived lack of innovation, with many deeming the game to be inferior to previous installments, although the visuals, controls, and multiplayer were praised.

Gameplay

Before starting a regular match, Mega Battle, players choose from 16 playable characters, and determine either competing in 1-on-1 matches or 2-on-2 matches. From there, a court option is picked; each court is themed as a different texture of ground, of which effect the ball in speed and bounce. Matches include three occurring abilities: Chance Shots are glowing spots on the ground, and upon standing over it and pressing a certain button combination, allows the player to pull off a powerful move; Jump Shots, an ability that allows the player to jump up and hit the ball; and the Mega Mushroom, a mushroom thrown onto either sides of the court that causes the player to grow in size, allowing stronger and more distant hits on the ball. The game does not require motion controls.

The game has a total of 4 modes, including Mega Battle. Classic Tennis allows for creating a custom rule set, being able to remove Chance Shots, Jump Shots or the Mega Mushroom. Knockback Challenge is a single player game mode, where the player competes against opponents, increasing in difficulty after each win. Online Multiplayer supports single or multiplayer; players compete against worldwide opponents in either Mega Battle or Classic Tennis.

The game supports amiibo functionality, where the player can train the character through artificial intelligence to compete in matches similarly to the player. The trained amiibo can compete as an additional competitor in online matches.

Development 
Camelot Software Planning, the creators of previous Mario Tennis games, developed Ultra Smash. The game, upon its reveal, was announced for Holiday 2015, later being released on November 20, 2015. According to the director, Shugo Takahashi, the developers aimed to create a game that was generally simple enough to "give anyone the taste of how tennis is interesting"; they compared their concept to Mario Tennis on the Nintendo 64.

The Jump Shot was an idea requested by Nintendo early into development. It was implemented due to the move having multiple gateway elements that could add a layer of strategy, such as where and how to hit the ball. Mega Battle was proposed by Camelot, of which the idea was created from considering concepts that could be used with HD graphics. The idea was implemented so players could have "Mario-ish features while playing tennis". Takahashi stated that there was constant trial and error creating larger scale models, such as being able to see the ball and creating a proper hitbox. Similar courses were created to have the sense of unity 

Halfway through development, Nintendo wanted the game to have amiibo functionality. They conceptualized the concept of training a character to play like the player, similar to Super Smash Bros. for Nintendo 3DS and Wii U. Camelot proceeded with the idea, due to the company being familiar with the role-playing game genre, having developed games of the genre in the past.

Characters 

Deciding the roster, Camelot used pre-existing characters from older franchises in hopes that players would gravitate towards characters they recognized. Each character's skills were determined based upon their appearance. Using this, the developers found it difficult to balance the skills for each character alongside opinions of stats from the fans. They considered Mario to be the most difficult to compare and balance, due to him being the "starter character" that could not be too strong or too weak.

Reception 

Ultra Smash received "mixed" reviews, according to video game review aggregator Metacritic.

IGN's Marty Sliva gave the game 4.8 out of 10, calling it "a bare-bones, lackluster addition to Mario's sporting adventures". He also compared it unfavorably to its predecessors by stating "that Mario Power Tennis on the GameCube managed to include more characters, interesting modes, and varied courses a decade ago is a bit insulting." GameSpot's  Scott Butterworth similarly criticized the lack of game modes and alternate ways to play and awarded the game 6 out of 10. Nintendo World Report's Daan Koopman lambasted the game for having "just one stadium, limited online options and less features than the previous 2 entries."

References

External links 
 

2015 video games
Nintendo Network games
Multiplayer and single-player video games
Tennis video games
Video game sequels
Wii U eShop games
Wii U games
Wii U-only games
Mario Tennis
Video games scored by Motoi Sakuraba
Video games developed in Japan
Video games that use Amiibo figurines
Camelot Software Planning games
Video games about size change
Tennis in fiction